Blair Douglas Chapman (born June 13, 1956 in Lloydminster, Alberta) is a retired professional ice hockey player.

Playing career
Chapman was drafted number one overall in the 1976 WHA Amateur Draft by the Edmonton Oilers, and also number two overall in the 1976 NHL Amateur Draft by the Pittsburgh Penguins. He was a highly touted prospect due to his stellar performance with the Saskatoon Blades of the Western Hockey League; in his draft year he recorded 157 points in 69 games. He never really lived up to his potential professionally though, and recorded 231 career points in 402 career NHL games for the Penguins and the St. Louis Blues. He retired in 1983.

Career statistics

Awards
 WCHL Second All-Star Team – 1976

External links
 

1956 births
Living people
Canadian expatriate ice hockey players in the United States
Canadian ice hockey right wingers
Edmonton Oilers (WHA) draft picks
Ice hockey people from Alberta
Kelowna Buckaroos players
National Hockey League first-round draft picks
Pittsburgh Penguins draft picks
Pittsburgh Penguins players
St. Louis Blues players
Salt Lake Golden Eagles (CHL) players
Saskatoon Blades players
Sportspeople from Lloydminster
World Hockey Association first-overall draft picks
World Hockey Association first round draft picks